Yeletsky is an urban locality (an urban-type settlement) under the administrative jurisdiction of the town of republic significance of Vorkuta in the Komi Republic, Russia. As of the 2010 Census, its population was 631.

Administrative and municipal status
Within the framework of administrative divisions, the urban-type settlement of Yeletsky, together with two rural localities, is incorporated as Yeletsky Urban-Type Settlement Administrative Territory, which is subordinated to the town of republic significance of Vorkuta. Within the framework of municipal divisions, Yeletsky is a part of Vorkuta Urban Okrug.

References

Notes

Sources

Urban-type settlements in the Komi Republic
